Václav Kliment Klicpera (23 November 1792 – 15 September 1859) was a Czech playwright, writer, and poet. He was one of the first presenters of Czech drama, and was especially influential in the foundation of comedic Czech theatre.

Klicpera was born in Chlumec nad Cidlinou. After graduating from a gymnasium (a European secondary school) in 1813, he moved to Prague.  There he studied philosophy in 1816 and medicine in 1818. In June 1819 he was made a professor at a gymnasium in Hradec Králové. In 1850 he became schoolmaster of a Prague gymnasium.

He was skilled in writing chivalric plays and patriotically-themed historical dramas that became the foundation of modern Czech drama. He is also recognized for his farces (in Czech frašky), in the Plautine tradition. He also wrote historical romance stories, plays from his own era, and plays with fairy tale motifs. Klicpera supported the advancement of Czech theatre through the publication of plays in the Klicpera's theatre edition.

He died in Prague and is buried in the city's Olšany Cemetery.

Works
 Divotvorný klobouk, 1820
 Hadrián z Římsů, 1821
 Ján za chrta dán, 1829
 Rohovín Čtverrohý, 1825
 Zlý jelen, 1849

External links
 2001 "Czechs in History" article on Radio Praha website

1792 births
1859 deaths
Czech male dramatists and playwrights
Czech male poets
Czech schoolteachers
People from Chlumec nad Cidlinou
19th-century Czech poets
19th-century Czech dramatists and playwrights
19th-century male writers
Burials at Olšany Cemetery